The Radiation Monitoring Center (RMC) is the agency of the Atomic Energy Council of the Taiwan (ROC) which carries out monitoring of natural and man-made ionizing radiation in the environment and within the vicinity of nuclear power plants in Taiwan.

History
The center was originally established in 1974 as Taiwan Radiation Monitoring Station. In 1996, it was changed to Radiation Monitoring Center.

Organization
 Environmental Radiochemistry Analysis Division
 Radiation Protection and Investigation Division
 Information and Dosimeter Division
 Secretariat Office
 Personnel Office
 Accounting and Statistics Office

See also
 Nuclear power in Taiwan

References

External links
  

1974 establishments in Taiwan
Executive Yuan
Government agencies established in 1974
Radiation protection organizations